This is a list of Lechia Gdańsk managers. The current manager is Marcin Kaczmarek, who is serving his second stint as manager for the club. Most of the managers through Lechia's history have been Polish, however in recent years more nationalities have been represented. Currently there have been 7 managers from countries other than Poland, the first being Václav Křížek (Czech Republic) in 1949, and most recently Adam Owen (Wales) in 2018. Both Jerzy Jastrzębowski and Piotr Stokowiec could be seen as Lechia's most successful managers, with Jastrzębowski winning both the Polish Cup and Polish SuperCup in 1983, and getting Lechia promoted from III liga and II liga in successive seasons in 1983 and 1984, with Stokowiec winning Lechia’s second Polish Cup and Polish SuperCup, while leading the team to their joint highest ever Ekstraklasa finish of 3rd, all in 2019. The other manager who has the record for managing Lechia to their highest finish in the Polish league is Tadeusz Foryś who achieved the feat in 1956.

Managers 
The list of managers from 1949 is complete.

The first person to be classed as a head coach or manager of Lechia Gdańsk is Zygmunt Czyżewski who was in place for the first year after the clubs founding in 1945, while the club was in the regional divisions of Polish football. Czyżewski held this role while also being a player for the club, being the clubs first and only known player-manager. After Czyżewski left the role there are no known persons who held such a clear and defined role as "head coach" between 1946 until the clubs promotion into the Ekstraklasa in 1949. It is likely that during this time a player at the club also held the role of manager while playing, having a role similar to Czyżewski. By Lechia's own admission it was not until 1949 when the club made their first appearance in the Ekstraklasa did they have their first proper manager at the club when Ryszard Koncewicz was given the role.

In total there have been 61 different people appointed as manager of Lechia Gdańsk over 74 different managerial appointments. Nine managers of Lechia Gdańsk have spent more than one spell at the club, the highest being Michał Globisz who held the position of manager four times, albeit two of those times being as caretaker-manager. 17 of the 61 managers previously spent time at Lechia during their playing careers. Aside from Polish, seven other nationalities have been represented by foreign managers, with no foreign manager having managed to win more than 10 games as manager. In two of the managerial appointments, the clubs official sources claim there have been two people working together as the manager of the team. Both of these instances occurred during the Lechia-Polonia Gdańsk spell between 1998 and 2002. The first such instance was when Lechia-Polonia was first merged with Witold Kulik and Stanisław Stachura managing together for 29 games. The other instance happened after the sacking of Jerzy Jastrzębowski when Wiesław Wika and Lech Kulwicki jointly became the caretaker-managers. It should be noted however that in these instances it is most likely that Witold Kulik and Wiesław Wika were the official managers of the team, with Stanisław Stachura and Lech Kulwicki being the assistant managers during their appointments during this time. Wika was in charge of one game, winning the game, and are therefor technically the only managers in the clubs history to have a perfect record. The turnover rate of managers throughout the clubs history has been high with only four managers, Jerzy Jastrzębowski, Stanisław Stachura, Bogusław Kaczmarek and Piotr Stokowiec having made it to 100 games as manager for the club.

Dates
Some of the managers full dates of when they started/finished the job are known, where as with others its only the year that is known. The dates have been added to try and give the most accurate representation of when the manager held their role at the club.

If a manager is known to have left at the end of the season but the full date is not known, the date listed is that of the final official date of the season (for example this date is usually on 30 June if the season runs July–June), the same is for if a manager is known to have started at the beginning of the following season, the date listed will be the first official date of the season (this is usually 1 July if the season runs July–June). Some managers are known to have started their role after the winter break, if the official date is not known these will be listed as 1 February as often friendlies/official games were not played in January.

List

Statistics & Records

Records

(Correct as of 1 September 2022)

Most games as manager: Jerzy Jastrzębowski – (156 games)
Most wins as manager: Jerzy Jastrzębowski – 103
Most draws as manager: Bogusław Kaczmarek – 44
Most defeats as manager: Stanisław Stachura – 66
Most Ekstraklasa games as manager: Piotr Stokowiec – 121
Highest win percentage in managers Lechia career (minimum 10 games): Tadeusz Małolepszy – 78.9% (30 wins in 38 games)
Lowest win percentage in managers Lechia career (minimum 10 games): Edward Wojewódzki – 7.7% (1 wins in 13 games)
Managers who have managed at least 100 games for Lechia: Jerzy Jastrzębowski (156), Bogusław Kaczmarek (148), Piotr Stokowiec (139), Stanisław Stachura (127)
Longest single managerial tenure by time: Tadeusz Foryś 3 years 10 months (1,399 days)
Longest single managerial tenure by games: Piotr Stokowiec (139 games)

Managerial statistics

This is a list of Lechia Gdańsk managers and their statistics in competitive competitions. The list includes caretaker managers, those managers given the contract on a caretaker/interim basis are shown in italics.

Stats correct as of 4 March 2023.

Honours
This is a list of honours of Lechia Gdańsk and the manager who was in charge of Lechia when they achieved that honour.

Ekstraklasa
Third place: 1956 (Tadeusz Foryś), 2018–19 (Piotr Stokowiec)
Polish Cup
 Winners: 1983 (Jerzy Jastrzębowski), 2019 (Piotr Stokowiec)
 Runners-up: 1955 (Tadeusz Foryś), 2020 (Piotr Stokowiec)
Polish SuperCup:
 Winners: 1983 (Jerzy Jastrzębowski), 2019 (Piotr Stokowiec)
I liga
 Winners: 1951 (Czesław Bartolik), 1983–84 (Jerzy Jastrzębowski), 2007–08 (Dariusz Kubicki)
 Runners-up: 1954 (Tadeusz Foryś), 1974–75 (Wojciech Łazarek), 1975–76 (Grzegorz Polakow), 1977–78 (Józef Walczak)
 Third place: 1978–79 (Janusz Pekowski)
II liga
 Winners: 1971–72 (Roman Rogocz), 1982–83 (Jerzy Jastrzębowski), 2004–05 (Marcin Kaczmarek)
 Runners-up: 1967–68 (Bogumił Gozdur), 1970–71 (Jerzy Słaboszowski)
 Third place: 1969–70 (Bogumił Gozdur), 1997–98 (Andrzej Bikiewicz)
European Competitions
European Cup Winners Cup:
 First round: 1983–84 (Jerzy Jastrzębowski)
Europa League
 Second qualifying round: 2019–20 (Piotr Stokowiec)
Europa Conference League
 Second qualifying round: 2022–23 (Tomasz Kaczmarek)

Condensed

Top three Ekstraklasa finishes

International managers 

The managers below have managed Lechia as well as managing an international team at some point during their career. The dates in brackets are the managers time with Lechia.

 Poland
  1952, 1963–1964, Tadeusz Foryś (1954–1957)
  1968–1970, Ryszard Koncewicz (1949)
  1978–1980, Ryszard Kulesza (1972–1974)
  1986–1989, Wojciech Łazarek (1974–1975, 1984–1986)
  2003–2006, Paweł Janas (2011–2012)
  2018–2020, Jerzy Brzęczek (2014–2015)

Antigua and Barbuda
  2014–2015, Piotr Nowak (2016–2017)

Sudan
  2002–2004, Wojciech Łazarek (1974–1975, 1984–1986)

Tunisia
  1981–1983, Ryszard Kulesza (1972–1974)

References 

Lechia Gdańsk